But Always is a 2014 Chinese-Hong Kong romantic drama film directed by Snow Zou.

Plot
But Always takes place in New York City, however, though it focuses on Asian culture in America.

Anran and Yongyuan meet in 1982, when Anran transfers to Yongyuan's school. She is wealthier than her classmates who approach her with suspicion. The school bully assigns Yongyuan to follow Anran, which is a role that he happily accepts for the next 20 years. One sign of his devotion is that he can always recognise her footsteps.

Anran and Yongyuan bond as they share the common tragedy of losing their mother in the same earthquake. However, their mothers come from different backgrounds,  as Yougyuan's was a peasant and Anran was a doctor. Yongyuan's guardian dies and his uncle takes him away. He's not allowed to say goodbye to Anran, a pattern that recurs as one or the other repeatedly vanishes.

A decade later, Yongyuan returns to Beijing and encounters Anran, who is now a pre-med student. She's now grown up to be played by Chinese actress Gao Yuanyuan (Caught in the Web). Yongyuan is now portrayed by Hong Kong action star Nicholas Tse (The Bullet Vanishes).

Yongyuan gets involved in some shady business to raise money for Anran's post-graduate education. When she is ready to leave for Columbia University, he disappears again.

In Manhattan, Anran gets a new boyfriend. He is a petulant painter called Michael (Qin Hao). She also works two part-time jobs in addition to her studies.

Yongyuan, who has gotten rich just so he can search for Anran, finds her through Michael's paintings of her. This leads to another sweet, luminously photographed reunion. But the couple is torn apart twice more.

Cast
Nicholas Tse as 赵永远 
Gao Yuanyuan as 安然
Du Haitao
Alice Li
Lam Suet
Che Xiao
Li Wenling
Shi Pengyuan
Shi Xinyi
Qin Hao
Anya Wu
Tong Dawei as 安然的变态老师
Jack Kao
Zang Tianshuo

Reception
By 28 September, it had earned ¥225.77 million at the Chinese box office.

See also
I Love That Crazy Little Thing, another film by the same director

References

External links
 

2014 romantic drama films
Chinese romantic drama films
Hong Kong romantic drama films
2014 films
2010s Cantonese-language films
2010s Mandarin-language films
Films set in Beijing
Films shot in Beijing
Films shot in New York City
Wanda Pictures films
2014 directorial debut films
2010s Hong Kong films